During the 1974–75 English football season, Everton F.C. competed in the Football League First Division. They finished 4th in the table with 50 points.

Final league table

Results

Football League First Division

League Cup

FA Cup

Squad

References

1974-75
Everton F.C. season